Daniel Leslie Francis (born 1 October 1986) is a retired footballer who played as a forward. Born in England, he represented the Dominica national team.

Career

Club career
Francis started his youth footballing career with teams Arsenal and Leyton Orient. He then joined Enfield Town in January 2004, making his professional debut with Enfield in an Essex Senior League Cup tie against Bowers United. Francis then moved on to feature for  Aveley and thereafter for club Canvey Island in July 2007.

He also went on to link up afterward with sides Potters Bar Town, Walton & Hersham and Leyton.
Francis was at Dulwich Hamlet in early 2009, and then appeared for Grays Athletic in a July 2009 pre-season friendly against West Ham United. In early 2011, Francis joined up with Bishop's Stortford. Francis signed with Thurrock at the beginning of the 2015–16 season, before moving on to Haringey Borough in September 2016.

International career
Francis earned two caps for the Dominican national team in 2008, both of which were FIFA World Cup qualifying matches.

Personal life
Francis is a fan of Arsenal Football Club.

References

1986 births
Living people
Footballers from Greater London
People with acquired Dominica citizenship
Dominica footballers
Dominica international footballers
English footballers
English people of Dominica descent
Arsenal F.C. players
Leyton Orient F.C. players
Enfield Town F.C. players
Aveley F.C. players
Canvey Island F.C. players
Potters Bar Town F.C. players
Dulwich Hamlet F.C. players
Walton & Hersham F.C. players
Leyton F.C. players
Tilbury F.C. players
Bishop's Stortford F.C. players
Thurrock F.C. players
Haringey Borough F.C. players
Isthmian League players
Association football forwards